Cheshmeh-ye Shir Ali (also Romanized as Cheshmeh-ye Shīr ʿAlī) is a village in Arkavazi Rural District, Chavar District, Ilam County, Ilam Province, Iran. At the 2006 census, its population was 40, in 7 families. The village is populated by Kurds.

References 

Populated places in Ilam County
Kurdish settlements in Ilam Province